677 (Suffolk and Norfolk Yeomanry) Squadron Army Air Corps, was formed on 2 July 2006, from the re-role of 202 (The Suffolk and Norfolk Yeomanry) Battery Royal Artillery (Volunteers). It is part of 6 Regiment Army Air Corps

Initially based on the four Territorial Army centres of Bury St Edmunds, Ipswich, Norwich and Swaffham; under the Army 2020 reorganisation that saw the Territorial Army become the Army Reserve, the drill hall at Swaffham closed in January 2014.

The Squadron provides ground support to the Apache Attack Helicopter and is paired with 3 Regiment Army Air Corps.  It provides ground support for the Apache aircraft.

Laydown
The Squadron is now organised thus:

 SHQ and A Flight - Bury St Edmunds;
 B Flight - Norwich;
 C Flight - Ipswich

See also

 List of Army Air Corps aircraft units

References

Army Air Corps aircraft squadrons
Norfolk Yeomanry
Suffolk Yeomanry
Military units and formations in Norfolk
Military units and formations in Suffolk
Military units and formations established in 2006